Hamigera is a genus of sponges belonging to the family Hymedesmiidae.

The species of this genus are found in Europe, Northern America and Australia.

Species:

Hamigera bibiloniae 
Hamigera cleistochela 
Hamigera dendyi 
Hamigera hamigera 
Hamigera kellyae 
Hamigera macrostrongyla 
Hamigera strongylata 
Hamigera tarangaensis

References

Sponges